Team Dasma Monarchs is a men's volleyball team based in Dasmariñas which competed in the PNVF Champions League.

History
Representing Dasmariñas, Cavite, Team Dasma Monarchs entered the inaugural 2021 PNVF Champions League. The team roster of the side coached by Norman Miguel was formed in early October 2021 and consisted mostly of collegiate players who had not won a UAAP or NCAA title. The Monarchs clinched the tournament title by overcoming the Go for Gold–Air Force Aguilas in the final. The finishing was considered an upset due to the Aguilas having national players in its lineup. Consequentially they clinch a berth at the 2022 Asian Men's Club Volleyball Championship.

Current roster 

Coaching staff
 Head coach:Norman Miguel
 Assistant coach:Jopet Adriam Movido

Records
2021 PNVF Champions League

References

Sports in Cavite
Men's volleyball teams in the Philippines